SunTrust Bank Nigeria Limited (STBNL), is a Nigerian financial services provider, licensed as a commercial bank, by the Central Bank of Nigeria, the central bank and national banking regulator.

Location
The headquarters and main branch of this bank are located at 1 Oladele Olashore Street, Off Sanusi Fafunwa Street, on Victoria Island, Lagos, Lagos State, Nigeria. The geographical coordinates of the bank's headquarters are: 06°25'50.0"N, 03°25'38.0"E (Latitude:6.430556; Longitude:3.427222).

Overview
As of 31 December 2017, SunTrust Bank Nigeria Limited had total assets of ₦26.56 billion (approximately US$74.24 million), with shareholders' equity of ₦10.61 billion (approximately US$29.7 million).

History
SunTrust was incorporated and founded in 2009 by Chief Executive, Muhammad Jibrin Barde as a mortgage bank and later converted to and was granted a regional commercial banking license by the Central Bank of Nigeria in November 2015, being the first commercial bank to receive a banking license since 2001, bringing the total of licensed commercial banks in Nigeria, at that time, to twenty-three. The bank opened for business to the public on 15 August 2016.

In April 2018, STBNL was awarded the ISO/IEC 20071:2013 Certification by the Professional Evaluation and Certification Board (PECB), a Canadian certification body. At the same time, it was awarded the Payment Card Industry Data Security Standard (PCIDSS), by Digital Jewels, an IT consulting firm, focusing on IT governance, risk & compliance in Information Security, Information Assurance and Project Management.

Branches
As of August 2016, the bank maintained brick-and-mortar branches and automated teller machines in Lagos, Abuja, Uyo and Port-Harcourt. At that time, 90 percent of the bank's customers transacted business on digital platforms, without visiting any physical branch.

See also
List of banks
List of banks in Nigeria

References

External links
Website of SunTrust Bank Nigeria Limited
 

Banks of Nigeria
Companies based in Lagos
Banks established in 2016
Nigerian companies established in 2016